Tobias Blättler, born 11 October 1981, in Lucerne, Switzerland, is a professional race car driver.  As a Formula Three driver he is a two time vice-champion in this class in Switzerland 2003 and in Austria 2004.

Like many successful race car drivers, he first got into racing in 1993 karting in Europe until 1999.  Since 2000 he drove in the competitive Swiss Formula Three, where he became vice-champion in 2003. In 2004 he drove in the Austrian Formula Three and became vice-champion again. In 2005 he was a test-driver in the American Formula Atlantic Series, the European F3000 Series and he participated in the German Formula Three Recaro Trophy, where he held 4 Pole Positions and won 2 races (Assen and Nürburgring).

Since 2007, he competed in several GT and Sportscar series races.

External links
Official Homepage
Report on testing in Formula Atlantic
Formula Atlantic
Auto GP

Swiss racing drivers
Swiss Formula Three Championship drivers
Austrian Formula Three Championship drivers
German Formula Three Championship drivers
Living people
1981 births
ADAC GT Masters drivers
Sportspeople from Lucerne